Warren High School is the name of several high schools:
Warren High School (Warren, Arkansas)
Warren High School (Downey, California)
Warren Township High School in Gurnee, Illinois
Warren High School (Monmouth, Illinois)
Warren High School (Warren, Illinois)
Warren High School (Warren, Michigan)
Warren High School (Vincent, Ohio)
Warren Area High School, Warren, Pennsylvania
Earl Warren High School in San Antonio, Texas
Warren High School (Warren, Texas)